The HPK SP-1 a.k.a. "Some Pisser-1" is a single seat homebuilt aircraft.

Design and development
Engle Flying Service members, Harold Hayden, Art Payne, Robert Kinney, and Norman R. Benner developed the HPK SP-1 over the course of five years. Plans for a two-seat side by side, and four seat variants were not completed.

The SP-1 is a single-place, all-metal, low-wing aircraft with conventional landing gear and partial span split trailing edge flaps. The cowling is from a Piper Tri-Pacer.

Operational history
The aircraft was built and tested at Three-M airfield in Pennsylvania, home of Kaiser-Fleetwings Company. The prototype has been registered for over 50 years.

Specifications (HPK SP-1)

References

Homebuilt aircraft